"Number 13" is a ghost story by British writer M. R. James, included in his first collection Ghost Stories of an Antiquary (1904).

Plot summary 
While researching church history in Viborg, Denmark, in particular the events of the reformation, the narrator's cousin stays in a local inn, opting to stay in room Number 12. Once in his room, he notices that the space seems to grow smaller and his furniture sometimes vanishes. He hears dancing in the room next door, which he notices from its door marking is Number 13, however upon discussing the matter with the inn-keep, he learns that there is no such room number in the building, as it is considered bad luck.

The narrator asks the inn-keep to visit his room at night. While talking, the protagonist and the inn-keep hear ominous singing in the room next door. They check Number 14, but learn that its occupant thought it was them. They then discover the door to Number 13 which the narrator had seen earlier. A clawed hand attacks them, and they attempt to break down the door but break through the plaster wall. The occupants of 12 and 14 spend the night in a double bedded room.

The narrator meets his cousin a few months later, and relates the tale to him.

Adaptations 
In 2000, the story was adapted for television as part of the Ghost Stories for Christmas series by the BBC, and starred Sir Christopher Lee as James narrating his story.

In 2006, the story was adapted for television starring Greg Wise, Paul Freeman and David Burke.

References

External links

 
Full text of "Number 13"
A Podcast to the Curious: Episode 5 - Number 13

Short stories by M. R. James
Horror short stories
1904 short stories